Pop 'Im Pop! is a 1950 Warner Bros. Looney Tunes theatrical cartoon short directed by Robert McKimson and written by Warren Foster. The short was released on October 28, 1950, and stars Sylvester the Cat, Hippety Hopper and Sylvester Jr., in the latter's first appearance.

Plot
The cartoon opens with a circus featuring "Gracie, the Fightin' Kangaroo!". When Gracie goes off to perform, she leaves her young son, Hippety Hopper, alone in her dressing room. Hippety slips on a pair of his mother's boxing gloves, and wanders off (along the way, treading in wet cement, much to the anger of the workman who is paving the new sidewalk, falling into a pink dress and causing several cars to crash).

Meanwhile, Sylvester is bragging to his son about how he took on a mouse about his own size. Unfortunately, Hippety shows up behind him, leading Sylvester into a panic. Junior urges Sylvester to fight Hippety, as they both think he's a giant mouse, and says that if he doesn't, he'll "disillusion a child's faith in his father." The result is a fight between Hippety and Sylvester. Hippety wins at first, but then Sylvester chases him off with an axe. Along the way, they pass the workman, who treads in his own cement as if daring the participants in the chase to do the same – but when they do not, he stands in the center of the sidewalk and plays "Taps" on a bugle as he sinks.

Sylvester is led to the circus, and right when Junior enters his sight, he starts gloating again ("... and if I ever catch ya again, I'll give ya the same thing! Only THIS time, I'll break BOTH your legs, you giant mouse, you!"). After gloating, Sylvester says he wished Hippety was twice as big, with 4 arms and 2 heads. Ironically, Gracie comes out with Hippety in her pouch, causing both the cats to run off. Hippety gives them a friendly wave good-bye, and the cartoon closes.

Cast 
 Mel Blanc as Sylvester, Sylvester Jr., Carny Barker, and Stage Manager.

Other appearances
Gracie makes a brief cameo during the final scene of  Who Framed Roger Rabbit with several other Looney Tunes characters. She is colored light brown in the film.

References

External links
 

1950 films
1950 animated films
1950 short films
1950s Warner Bros. animated short films
Looney Tunes shorts
Sylvester the Cat films
Films about father–son relationships
Animated films about kangaroos and wallabies
Films about mother–son relationships
Circus films
Films directed by Robert McKimson
Films scored by Carl Stalling
Warner Bros. Cartoons animated short films
1950s English-language films
Hippety Hopper films